Cumberland Flank Battery was an artillery battery in the British Overseas Territory of Gibraltar.

Description
The Cumberland Flank Battery was a large battery that was around the docks area and could fire at enemy shipping that approached Gibraltar Harbour. In 1859 there were 32 guns that made up the Cumberland Flank and the New Mole Battery. Today there is a Cumberland Road on the rock to the east of the dockyard which records the battery's name.

References

Batteries in Gibraltar